Josh Gray may refer to:

 Josh Gray (rugby union) (born 2001), English rugby union player
 Josh Gray (basketball) (born 1993), American basketball player
 Josh Gray (footballer) (born 1991), English football player